Benecke-Kaliko AG, based in Hanover, develops and manufactures technical and decorative surface materials made of plastics. Since 2017, it presents itself under the Continental brand.

Company  

Benecke-Kaliko AG is based in Hanover and forms part of the Benecke-Hornschuch Surface Group, which is a business segment of the ContiTech-Group. Its core expertise lies in the area of automotive interior trims. Benecke-Kaliko's production activities are spread across four sites. In 2016, it generated sales of €599 million euro with a workforce of over 2,900 employees Benecke-Kaliko is the world market leader in the manufacture of sheeting for automotive interiors. The company produces soft trim for instrument panels, sun visors, glove compartment covers, airbag seals, door and side trim, seating, center consoles, and convertible roofs on behalf of automotive manufacturers. Benecke-Kaliko's materials are also installed in airplanes, trains, RVs, and different industrial applications as well as on ships.

Main sites and products

At its headquarters in the Vinnhorst district of Hanover, Benecke-Kaliko employed around 1,000 staff members producing 36 mio m2 of surface materials in 2015.

At the Eislingen site, 500 employees manufactured in the same year around 18 mio m2 of thermoplastic polyolefin (TPO) sheeting a year.

In 2015, Benecke-Kaliko AG produced approximately 86 mio m2 of surface materials.

Since 2006, Benecke Changshun Auto Trim Co., Ltd. based in Zhangjiagang, China, has manufactures PVC foam laminate and PVC-expanded leather for the Chinese automotive industry, producing up to 20 million m2 a year with a workforce of around 480 staff members (2018). This company is a joint venture with the Chinese automotive plastics retailer Jiangsu Changshun Group Co., Ltd. In 2013 a TPO production line was added.

A new plant was built in San Luis Potosí, Mexico, in 2008.
 The company has invested around €8 million in the factory. Since the start of 2009, this plant has been producing PVC foam laminate and PVC-expanded leather, as well as TPO compact foil and foam laminate for the American market – up to 7 million m2 a year. The plant employed around 250 staff members in 2018.

Benecke-Kaliko has sales offices in numerous countries worldwide such as the USA, Brazil and India.

In fall 2014, Benecke-Kaliko started building a second Chinese plant in Changzhou. Series production (capacity of 10 mio m2 a year) started end of 2015 with approximately 100 employees. In 2015, the location had 159 employees. In addition, the company has acquired two locations from the Belgian Mecaseat Group in Pamplona, Spain and in Wagrowiec, Poland. Both locations combined had 150 employees in the year 2018 and a capacity to produce around 8 million m2 of surface materials. With this acquisition, Benecke-Kaliko strengthened inter alia its industrial sector.

History 

The company's history dates back to 1718, when wall and ceiling covering materials were produced in Hanover under the name of "Königlich privilegierte Wachstuchmacherey vor dem Steinthore" ["Royally privileged oilcloth factory in front of the stone gate"] (i.e. outside the city walls, on Am Judenkirchhof). The relocation of the plant to its current site in Vinnhorst began in 1898 and the plant was opened in 1901.

The merger with Göppinger Kaliko GmbH took place in 1993, thereby creating the link with ContiTech Holding. In 2017, Benecke-Kaliko purchased the Hornschuch Group, headquartered in Weißbach, Germany, with more than 1,800 employees at four production locations in Germany and the USA and integrated the company in the business segment Benecke-Hornschuch Surface Group operating under the Continental brand. As a result, the company is expanding its industrial business and is opening up new sales markets, especially in North America.

External links
 Website: Benecke-Kaliko AG
 Website: ContiTech AG
 SolVin Award for PVC Innovation 2013

References 

Manufacturing companies based in Hanover
Auto parts suppliers of Germany
1718 establishments in the Holy Roman Empire
Companies established in 1718